In Hinduism, Vanara are either monkeys, apes, or a race of forest-dwelling people.

In the epic the Ramayana, the Vanaras help Rama defeat Ravana. They are generally depicted as humanoid apes, or human-like beings.

Etymology 

There are three main theories about the etymology of the word "Vanara":

 Aiyanar suggests that vanara means "monkey" derived from the word vana ("forest"), Literally meaning "belonging to the forest" Monier-Williams says it is probably derived from vanar (lit. "wandering in the forest") and means "forest-animal" or monkey.
 Devdutt Pattanaik suggests that it derives from the words vana ("forest"), and nara ("man"), thus meaning "forest man" and suggests that they may not be monkeys, which is the general meaning.
 It may be derived from the words vav and nara, meaning "is it a man?" (meaning "monkey") or "perhaps he is man".

Identification 

Although the word Vanara has come to mean "monkey" over the years and the Vanaras are depicted  as monkeys in the popular art, their exact identity is not clear. According to the Ramayana, Vanaras were shapeshifters. In the Vanara form, they had beards with extended sideburns, narrowly shaved chin gap, and no moustache. They had a tail and razor-sharp claws. Their skin and skeleton were inforced with an indestructible Vajra, which no earthly element could penetrate. Unlike other exotic creatures such as the rakshasas, the Vanaras do not have a precursor in the Vedic literature. The Ramayana presents them as humans with reference to their speech, clothing, habitations, funerals, weddings, consecrations etc. It also describes their monkey-like characteristics such as their leaping, hair, fur and a tail.<ref name="Catherine1994">{{cite book |author=Catherine Ludvik |title=Hanumān in the Rāmāyaṇa of Vālmīki and the Rāmacaritamānasa of Tulasī Dāsa |url=https://books.google.com/books?id=KCXQN0qoAe0C&pg=PA2 |date=1 January 1994 |publisher=Motilal Banarsidass |isbn=978-81-208-1122-5 |pages=2–3|quote=G. Ramadas infers from Ravana's reference to the ''kapis tail as an ornament (bhusana) that is a long appendage in the dress worn by men of the Savara tribe.}}</ref> Aiyanagar suggests that though the poet of the Ramayana may have known that vanaras were actually forest-dwelling people, he may portrayed them as real monkeys with supernatural powers and many of them as s (portions) of the gods to make the epic more "fantastic".

According to one theory, the Vanaras are semi-divine creatures. This is based on their supernatural abilities, as well as descriptions of Brahma commanding other deities to either bear Vanara offspring or incarnate as Vanaras to help Rama in his mission. The Jain re-tellings of Ramayana describe them as a clan of the supernatural beings called the Vidyadharas; the flag of this clan bears monkeys as emblems.

G. Ramdas, based on Ravana's reference to the Vanaras' tail as an ornament, infers that the "tail" was actually an appendage in the dress worn by the men of the Savara tribe. (The female Vanaras are not described as having a tail.) According to this theory, the non-human characteristics of the Vanaras may be considered artistic imagination. In Sri Lanka, the word "Vanara" has been used to describe the Nittaewos mentioned in the Vedda legends.

 In the Ramayana 

Vanaras are created by Brahma to help Rama in battle against Ravana. They are powerful and have many godly traits. Taking Brahma's orders, the gods began to parent sons in the zion of Kishkindha (identified with parts of present-day Karnataka, Andhra Pradesh, and Maharashtra). Rama first met them in Dandaka Forest, during his search for Sita. An army of Vanaras helped Rama in his search for Sita, and also in battle against Ravana, Sita's abductor. Nala and Nila built a bridge over the ocean so that Rama and the army could cross to Lanka. As described in the epic, the characteristics of the Vanara include being amusing, childish, mildly irritating, badgering, hyperactive, adventurous, bluntly honest, loyal, courageous, and kind.

 Other texts 
The Vanaras also appear in other texts, including Mahabharata. The epic Mahabharata describes them as forest-dwelling, and mentions their being encountered by Sahadeva, the youngest Pandava.

 Shapeshifting 

In the Ramayana, the Vanara Hanuman changes shape several times. For example, while he searches for the kidnapped Sita in Ravana's palaces on Lanka, he contracts himself to the size of a cat, so that he will not be detected by the enemy. Later on, he takes on the size of a mountain, blazing with radiance, to show his true power to Sita.

 Notable Vanaras 

 Angada, son of Vali, successor of Sugriva, who helped Rama find his wife Sita
 Anjana, Hanuman's mother
 Hanuman, devotee of the god Rama and son of Vayu
 Kesari, Hanuman's father
 Mainda and Dvivida, sons of Ashvins
 Macchanu, son of Hanuman (per the Cambodian and Thai versions)
 Makardhwaja, son of Hanuman (per the Indian versions)
 Nala, son of Vishwakarma
 Nila, son of Agni
 Rumā, wife of Sugriva
 Sharabha, son of Parjanya
 Sugriva, king of Kishkindha, son of Surya
 Sushena, son of Varuna
 Taar, son of Brihaspati
 Tara, wife of Vali
 Vali''', Sugriva's brother and son of Indra

In fiction

The Vanaras are also evil creatures in the tabletop roleplay game Gandariah Lords of Arcanas where they were created by the 
Garuda power to spread misfortune and avenge the rakshasas.

References

External links

Non-human races in Hindu mythology
Mythological monkeys
Mythological human hybrids